

Walter Gericke (23 December 1907 – 19 October 1991), was a German paratroop officer in the Luftwaffe of Nazi Germany during World War II and a general in the Bundeswehr of West Germany. He was a recipient of the Knight's Cross of the Iron Cross with Oak Leaves.

Gericke took part in the Battle of the Netherlands and the Battle of Crete as a Fallschirmjäger battalion commander. He later commanded the Fallschirjäger-Regiment 11 (part of the 4. Fallschirmjäger-Division) and fought in the Battle of Anzio.

Gericke joined the newly formed Bundeswehr after the rearmament of West Germany and as a Generalmajor led the 1. Luftlande-Division from 1962 to 1965.

In 1974, Gericke supported the establishment of a war cemetery in Maleme which is the final resting place for 4.465 German soldiers who lost their lives on the island of Crete during WWII.

Awards
 Iron Cross (1939) 2nd Class (10 April 40) & 1st Class (12 May 1940)
 German Cross in Gold on 12 December 1943 as Major in the II./Fallschirmjäger-Regiment 6
 Knight's Cross of the Iron Cross with Oak Leaves
 Knight's Cross on 14 June 1941 as Hauptmann and commander of the IV./Fallschirmjäger-Sturm-Regiment
 585th Oak Leaves on 17 September 1944 as Major and commander of Fallschirmjäger-Regiment 11

References

Citations

Bibliography

 
 
 

1907 births
1991 deaths
Fallschirmjäger of World War II
Recipients of the Gold German Cross
Recipients of the Knight's Cross of the Iron Cross with Oak Leaves
Commanders Crosses of the Order of Merit of the Federal Republic of Germany
Major generals of the German Army
German Army officers of World War II
Military personnel from Lower Saxony